Hilary Bertha Shuard CBE (14 November 192824 December 1992) was "an internationally known expert on mathematics in primary schools".

She was deputy principal of Homerton College, Cambridge, England and was president of the Mathematical Association for 1985–1986.

References

1928 births
1992 deaths
Commanders of the Order of the British Empire
Fellows of Homerton College, Cambridge
Mathematics educators
Schoolteachers from Cheshire
British women mathematicians
20th-century English mathematicians
20th-century women mathematicians
People from Cheshire